Yupadee Kobkulboonsiri ( –  27 April 2020) was a Thai-American artist and jewelry designer.

Life and education 
She was born and raised in Bangkok. She got a B.F.A. in decorative and visual communication design from Silpakorn University in Bangkok in 1986. She then worked as art director at Grey/Thailand, the international agency's Bangkok headquarters.

In 1999, Kobkulboonsiri earned an associate of applied science degree in jewelry design when she graduated from the Fashion Institute of Technology.

For nearly a decade she lived in a women's home run by the Sisters of Divine Providence of Kentucky, in order to save money to send to her family.

She began her career when she was recommended by FIT's professors to the owner of Grunberger Jewelry as the school's most promising alumnus. She worked at the company for 20 years, and while there became the first American winner of the World Gold Council's Gold Virtuosi Award. 

Kobkulboonsiri was a finalist or winner in every competition she entered.

In her last years, she produced furniture together with her husband.

Kobkulboonsiri was a devout Buddhist. She was married to Steven Fishman, an artist. She died from COVID-19 on 27 April 2020, at the age of 51.

Awards 
Her awards include:

 Bridal Design Category, JCK Jewelers Choice Awards, USA 
 Rising Star Awards, The Fashion Group International, USA  (2012)
 The International Pearl Design Contest, Japan
 Gold Virtuosi Award 2, World Gold Council Design Competition, Italy
 The North American Tahitian Pearl Trophy Awards, USA       
 Evocative Gold: A Renaissance, World Gold Council. UK     
 The First Jewelers Choice Awards, USA
 NICHE Awards, USA  
 The International South Sea Pearl Design Competition, Hong Kong      
 Gold Virtuosi Award 1, World Gold Council Design Competition, Italy
 The International Tahitian Pearl Trophy Awards, France  

 The North American Tahitian Pearl Trophy Awards, USA

References 

1968 births
2020 deaths
American jewelry designers
Yupadee Kobkulboonsiri
Thai emigrants to the United States
Deaths from the COVID-19 pandemic in New York (state)
Women jewellers